"Paradise" is a song recorded by South Korean girl group Hello Venus as the second collaboration with producing and writing team Devine Channel. It was released on July 18, 2016 by Fantagio Music. The lyrics were written by Yorkie and Ryu and the music was composed by Devine Channel and Nikki Paige. A music video for the song was also released on July 18.

Background and release 
On July 10, 2016, Fantagio Music announced that a second collaboration song between Hello Venus and Devine Channel will be released. On July 11, it was reported that a music video for the upcoming song was already shot and that the collaboration is titled 'Hello Venus x Devine Channel: Part 2, Paradise'. On July 14, it was revealed that "Paradise" will be released on July 18.

The song was released on July 18 in South Korea on MelOn as a digital download and worldwide on iTunes. The music video was released on the same day.

Track listing 
Digital download

Release history

References 

2016 singles
2016 songs
Hello Venus songs